Bat for Lashes (Natasha Khan), an English indie pop singer, has released five studio albums, three extended plays, twelve singles and ten music videos.

Bat for Lashes released her debut studio album, Fur and Gold in September 2006. The album reached number forty-eight in the United Kingdom and was certified silver by the British Phonographic Industry (BPI). Four singles, "The Wizard", "Trophy", "Prescilla"
and "What's a Girl to Do?", were released from the album.

Two Suns, her second studio album, followed in June 2009. It peaked at number five in the UK and was certified gold by the BPI. Three singles were released from the album: "Daniel", "Pearl's Dream" and "Sleep Alone", with "Daniel" charting at number thirty-six in the UK and number forty-seven in the Flanders region of Belgium. Bat for Lashes worked extensively with producers Dan Carey and David Kosten in recording her third studio album The Haunted Man. Released in October 2012, it peaked at number six in the UK. Three singles were released from the album: "Laura", "All Your Gold" and "A Wall".

Studio albums

Extended plays

Singles

Promotional singles

Other appearances

Music videos

Notes

References

External links
 
 

Discographies of British artists
Pop music discographies